Kingstone may refer to:

 Kingstone, Herefordshire (near Hereford)
 Kingstone High School
 Kingstone, Weston under Penyard, a hamlet in Weston under Penyard (also in Herefordshire)
 Kingstone, Somerset
 Kingstone, South Yorkshire, an area in the Metropolitan Borough of Barnsley
 Kingstone, Staffordshire

See also
Kingston (disambiguation)